The 1924 Washington State Cougars football team was an American football team that represented Washington State College during the 1924 college football season. Head coach Albert Exendine led the team to a 0–4–1 mark in the PCC and 1–5–2 overall.

Schedule

References

Washington State
Washington State Cougars football seasons
Washington State Cougars football